Hazaa Al-Hazaa (born 8 August 1991) is a Saudi football player who plays as a striker for Al-Tai in the Saudi Professional League and the Saudi Arabia national football team.

Hazaa started his career with Al-Ettifaq, coming through the youth ranks to make his debut as a 21-year-old in February 2013 before joining Al-Khaleej and Al-Safa on loan in 2014 and 2015, respectively. In October 2017, he made his international bow, featuring in two friendly matches and scoring once.

Career

Club career
Hazaa progressed through the youth ranks of Al-Ettifaq. After scoring 19 goals in the 2012–13 Saudi U-21 League, he made his senior debut at the age of 21 as a last-minute substitute in the 0–2 loss against Al-Nassr on February 18, 2013. He started his first game in the 1-1 draw against Al-Raed on April 18, 2013.

2013–14 season
He found limited opportunities while Al-Ettifaq was struggling for form and fighting relegation, where he only made two 15 and 25-minute cameo appearances against Al-Nassr and Al-Raed, respectively.

On January 13, 2014, he was loaned out to spend the second half of the season at Al-Khaleej in the Saudi First Division, where he scored three goals and played a key role in their qualification to the Saudi Professional League. He opened his goal-scoring account with a brace in the 5-0 victory against Al-Kawkab.

2014–15 season
He scored one goal in six appearances with Al-Ettifaq after they were relegated to the Saudi First Division for the first time in their history. His solitary goal came in the 2-1 win against Al-Safa on August 22, 2014.

During the second half of the season, Hazaa was loaned out on January 25, 2015 to Al-Safa, where his six goals could not prevent them from being relegated to the Saudi Second Division. He opened his record with a brace in the 3-1 win against Al-Nahda on February 13, 2015. On March 21, 2015, he scored his first hattrick in the 4-1 win against Al-Jeel.

2015–16 season
Hazaa played a key role in aiding Al-Ettifaq to win the Saudi First Division and clinch promotion to the Saudi Professional League, scoring eight goals in 19 appearances. During the first half of the season, he was largely deployed as a winger. On January 30, 2016, he scored his maiden goal in the 4-2 win against Al-Nahda, and followed that up with the winning goal against Al-Orobah on February 2, 2016. His rich goal scoring form continued in March & April 2016 with goals against Damac, Al-Diriyah, in addition to braces against Ohod and Al-Hazem.

2016–17 season
During Al-Ettifaq's first season back at the Saudi Professional League, Hazaa played 24 games, starting 9 of them. He played an instrumental role in ensuring the team's safety at the Saudi top tier. On September 16, 2016 he scored the equalizer in the 2-1 win against Al-Hilal and followed that up with goals against Al-Taawoun, Al-Ahli, Al-Ittihad, and Al-Qadsiah. His five goals and one assist in 997 minutes meant that he contributed a goal every 166 minutes.

2017–18 season
Hazaa started the season in an explosive form, scoring five goals in as many starts. In his first game, he netted twice in the 2-1 win against Al-Ahli, and followed that up by netting the injury-time equalizer in the 2-2 draw against Al-Nassr. His rich goal scoring vein continued with a brace in the 3-2 loss to Al-Shabab, and his team's solitary goal in the 1-1 draw with Al-Fateh. Hazaa's substantial contribution went beyond his goals, as he assisted both goals in the 2-1 win at Al-Fayha before scoring the first and assisting the second goal in his team's 2-0 win against Al-Raed. His season ended prematurely after suffering an ACL injury on December 23, 2017.

Al-Taawoun
On January 26, 2022, Al-Hazaa joined Pro League side Al-Taawoun on loan.

Al-Tai
On 31 August 2022, Al-Hazaa joined Al-Tai on a two-year deal.

International career
His great form in the 2017–18 season, earned him a first international call-up to Saudi Arabia national team under newly hired coach Edgardo Bauza. On October 7, 2017, he made his international bow in starting the 5–2 friendly win against Jamaica, scoring his maiden goal after 37 minutes and winning the penalty that led to the third goal. Three days later, he started his second game in the 3-0 loss against Ghana.

Career statistics

Club

International

International goals

Saudi Arabia score listed first, score column indicates score after each Hazaa goal.

Honours 
Al-Ettifaq
Saudi First Division: 2015-16 (champion, promotion)
Al-Khaleej
Saudi First Division: 2013-14 (runner-up, promotion)

References

External links 
 

1991 births
Living people
People from Dammam
Saudi Arabian footballers
Ettifaq FC players
Khaleej FC players
Al Safa FC players
Al-Taawoun FC players
Al-Tai FC players
Saudi First Division League players
Saudi Professional League players
Association football forwards
Saudi Arabia international footballers